Cerasinops (meaning 'cherry face') was a small ceratopsian dinosaur. It lived during the Campanian of the late Cretaceous Period. Its fossils have been found in Two Medicine Formation, in Montana. The type species of the genus Cerasinops is C. hodgskissi.

It belonged to the Ceratopsia (the name is Ancient Greek for 'horned face'), a group of herbivorous dinosaurs with parrot-like beaks that throve in North America and Asia during the Cretaceous Period. Within this group, it has been placed as a basal member of Neoceratopia, although the description is variable; at one point, it is explicitly assigned to Leptoceratopsidae, but in others, it is considered a sister taxon to Leptoceratopsidae, or as a neoceratopsian in general.

See also

 Timeline of ceratopsian research

References

Leptoceratopsids
Late Cretaceous dinosaurs of North America
Fossil taxa described in 2007
Taxa named by Jack Horner
Paleontology in Montana
Campanian genus first appearances
Campanian genus extinctions
Ornithischian genera